Holothuria lessoni, the golden sandfish, is a species of sea cucumber in the genus Holothuria, subgenus Metriatyla. This sea cucumber inhabits the shallow waters of the Indo-Pacific Ocean, where it is found near islands and reef flats. It is highly sought after in commercial and subsistence fishing and the species threatened by overfishing.

References

Holothuriidae